Giambattista Dal Mare, O.P. (died 1620) was a Roman Catholic prelate who served as Bishop of Lavello (1618–1620).

Biography
Giambattista Dal Mare was ordained a priest in the Order of Preachers.
On 22 October 1618, he was appointed during the papacy of Pope Paul V as Bishop of Lavello.
On 4 November 1618, he was consecrated bishop by Filippo Filonardi, Cardinal-Priest of Santa Maria del Popolo, with Diego Alvarez (archbishop), Archbishop of Trani, and Paolo De Curtis, Bishop Emeritus of Isernia, serving as co-consecrators. 
He served as Bishop of Lavello until his death on 23 September 1620.

References

External links and additional sources
 (Chronology of Bishops) 
 (Chronology of Bishops) 

17th-century Italian Roman Catholic bishops
Bishops appointed by Pope Paul V
1620 deaths
Dominican bishops